Muddina Kanmani is a 1997 Indian Kannada-language drama film, directed and produced by Ravi Kottarakara The film stars Shiva Rajkumar, Sai Kumar, Shilpa and Maathu. The film was a remake of director Rajasenan's Malayalam film Aadyathe Kanmani (1995).

Cast 
 Shiva Rajkumar as Shivaram Hegde
 Sai Kumar as Chandru
 Maathu as Ambika
 Shilpa as Hema
 Umashri as Mittemari Meenakshi Hegde, Shivaram's Mother
 C. R. Simha as Hegde, Shivaram's Father
 Ramesh Bhat as Sridhar Hegde, Shivaram's First Brother
 Shobharaj as Gudibande Gundayya
 Tennis Krishna as Chengumari
 Bank Janardhan as Ambika's Father
 M D Kaushik as Shivram's younger brother

Soundtrack 
The soundtrack of the film was composed by S. P. Venkatesh.

References

External links 

 

1997 films
1990s Kannada-language films
Indian comedy films
Kannada remakes of Malayalam films
Films scored by S. P. Venkatesh
1997 comedy films